Mountain View Officers' Club, built in 1942, is a historic structure that originally served as an officers' club for African American soldiers stationed at Fort Huachuca, Arizona.  It was long vacant, but was listed on the National Register of Historic Places in 2017 and there have been plans for its renovation.

History 
Fort Huachuca had the highest number of African American soldiers at any military installation in the United States between the years of 1892 and 1946. 

In 1942, the Mountain View Officers' Club was one of 1,400 buildings built to accommodate Fort Huachuca's Black infantry divisions. The club is the fort's only surviving recreational facility from this time.

The club was vacated in 1998 and has since faced multiple threats of demolition.

Restoration efforts 
It was listed on the National Register of Historic Places in 2017 as a result of two years of discussions between the U.S. Army authorities at Fort Huachuca, the Arizona State Historic Preservation Office, and the Tucson Historic Preservation Foundation.

The listing included one contributing building and four contributing structures.

In 2018, Arizona State Parks and Trails received $500,000 from the National Park Service’s African American Civil Rights Fund for the purpose of restoring the club. The National Trust for Historic Preservation's African-American Cultural Heritage Action Fund has also supported restoration efforts with a 2018 grant. Additional financial supporters have included the Pascua Yaqui tribe and Buffalo Soldier organizations.

As of 2022, the club still stands and is undergoing an extensive restoration project.

References

External links 
Analysis of the Mountain View Officers' Club: Fort Huachuca, Arizona, Army Corps of Engineers

Infrastructure completed in 1942
Buildings and structures in Cochise County, Arizona
Clubhouses in Arizona
African-American history of the United States military
1942 establishments in Arizona
Military officers' clubs
African-American history of Arizona
National Register of Historic Places in Cochise County, Arizona